The Battle of Garigliano was fought between the Vandals and the Western Roman Empire in Campania, Italy in 457. After having seized Carthage and made it the capital of their kingdom in 439, the Vandals frequently raided the territories of the Western Roman Empire. In 457, the new emperor Majorian surprised a Vandal-Berber raiding party which was returning with loot from Campania. They were engaged at the mouth of the river Garigliano. Many of the raiders were slaughtered before they could reach their ships or were driven into the sea and drowned. The Vandal king Genseric was avenged a few years later at the Battle of Cape Bon.

Sources
 

457
Garigliano
Garigliano
Garigliano
Military history of Italy
Garigliano